David Barclay (1823September 10, 1889) was a Democratic member of the U.S. House of Representatives from Pennsylvania.

Biography
Born in Punxsutawney, Pennsylvania in 1823, Barclay attended Washington College (now Washington & Jefferson College) in Washington, Pennsylvania. He studied law in Pittsburgh, was admitted to the bar and practiced in Punxsutawney, Brookville, and Kittanning, Pennsylvania.

He became one of the editors and publishers of the Pittsburgh Union and Legal Journal, and worked in that capacity from 1850 to 1855.

While a resident of Brookville, Barclay was elected as a Democrat to the Thirty-fourth Congress.

At the end of his legislative career, he resumed the practice of law.

Death and interment
Barclay died in Freeport, Pennsylvania on September 10, 1889, and was interred in the Freeport Cemetery.

Bibliography

References

1823 births
1889 deaths
Politicians from Pittsburgh
Washington & Jefferson College alumni
19th-century American newspaper publishers (people)
Pennsylvania lawyers
Democratic Party members of the United States House of Representatives from Pennsylvania
19th-century American journalists
American male journalists
19th-century American male writers
19th-century American politicians
People from Punxsutawney, Pennsylvania
19th-century American lawyers